The Policeman of the 16th Precinct is a 1959 Greek comedy film directed by Alekos Sakellarios.

Cast 
 Kostas Hatzichristos - Ilias
 Marika Krevata - Loukia
 Dionysis Papagiannopoulos - Labros
 Kyveli Theohari - Aleka Konstadinidi
 Giorgos Gavriilidis - Orestis Konstadinidis
 Aliki Georgouli - Tasia Berberi
 Stavros Xenidis - Vangelis
 Lavrentis Dianellos - Mastrolavrentis
 Alekos Tzanetakos - Spanomarias
 Thanasis Tzeneralis - police officer
 Kostas Papachristos - police sergeant
 Thanasis Veggos - Thomas
 Panagiotis Karavousanos - Panagos Berberis
 Zoi Fytousi - Mrs. Logotheti
 Lavrentis Dianellos - Lavrentis
 Niki Linardou - Elli
 Dimitra Seremeti-Papachristou - neighbour

Reception
Hal Erickson of AllRovi finds that the film is an excellent cure for insomnia for a non-Greek audience.

References

External links 

1959 comedy films
1959 films
Greek comedy films
Greek black-and-white films
1950s Greek-language films